The Color Spectrum is the name of both the fourth studio album by American progressive rock band The Dear Hunter, and a series of nine EPs by the band of which each reflects an individual color of the visible color spectrum (namely Black, Red, Orange, Yellow, Green, Blue, Indigo, Violet, White). This project was envisioned by frontman Casey Crescenzo as a way to interpret the colors of the spectrum via music. It is their first album that is not part of a common storyline with the rest of their work.

The Color Spectrum was released on June 14, 2011, in two different versions: the "standard" edition, featuring selected songs from the project, and the "Complete Collection" edition, featuring all nine EPs.

Background and recording
Brendan Brown (formerly in The Receiving End of Sirens with Casey) played bass guitar on the Orange EP.  Jessy Ribordy (Falling Up) played mandolin on the Green EP. Naive Thieves helped with songs on the Yellow and Blue EPs. Andy Hull (Manchester Orchestra) provided vocals on tracks 1–3 on the Red EP. Tanner Merriitt (O'Brother) sang on "A Curse Of Cynicism".
Mike Watts co produced the White and Violet EPs

On April 7, 2011, Crescenzo announced via Twitter that The Color Spectrum was finished.

Promotion and release
On April 14, 2011, the band released a free MP3 download of "Deny It All" from the Red EP on their website. On April 26, Alternative Press debuted a lyric video for "This Body" from the Black EP, created by Crescenzo.

Concept
The Color Spectrum's influence is the subjectivity of perception and to a lesser extent the freedom it affords its viewer. Crescenzo remarks:

Track listings

Standard release track listing

Complete collection track listing

References

External links 
 The Color Spectrum review on Prog Sphere
 The Color Spectrum (Complete Collection) review on Sputnikmusic

2011 albums
The Dear Hunter albums
Triple Crown Records albums
Albums produced by Casey Crescenzo
Concept albums